Lucka is a town in the Thuringian landkreis of Altenburger Land.

History
The settlement of the area around Lucka occurred in the early Stone Age (5000-2500 b.c.). Lucka was first mentioned in writing in 1320 as "opidum Luckowe". The area was also the site of a battle in 1307 between the Habsburgs and the Wettins. Within the German Empire (1871–1918), Lucka was part of the Duchy of Saxe-Altenburg. From 1952 to 1990, it was part of the Bezirk Leipzig of East Germany.

International relations

Lucka is twinned with:
Unterschleißheim, Bavaria
Weselberg, Rhineland-Palatinate

Town Division
Lucka is divided into three parts: the town itself, Breitenhain and Prößdorf.

Personalities
Friedrich August Belcke – trombonist
Otto Engert — a Communist politician (b. in Prößdorf)
Erika Zuchold - World Champion and Olympic Medalist in Gymnastics

References

The information in this article is based on and/or translated from that found in its German equivalent.

Altenburger Land
Duchy of Saxe-Altenburg